Ceredigion (also Cardiganshire) is a parliamentary constituency represented in the House of Commons of the UK Parliament. Created in 1536, the franchise expanded in the late 19th century and on the enfranchisement of women. Its boundaries remained virtually unchanged until 1983. From 1536 until 1885 the area had two seats (electing MPs): a county constituency (Cardiganshire) comprising the rural areas, the other the borough constituency known as the Cardigan District of Boroughs comprising a few separate towns; in 1885 the latter was abolished, its towns and electors incorporated into the former, reduced to one MP. The towns which comprised the Boroughs varied slightly over this long period, but primarily consisted of Cardigan, Aberystwyth, Lampeter and Adpar, the latter now a suburb of Newcastle Emlyn across the Teifi, in Carmarthenshire.

The county constituency (a distinction from borough class remains, namely as to type of returning officer and permissible electoral expenses) was merged in 1983 with part of Pembrokeshire, making a new constituency named Ceredigion and Pembroke North. In 1997 it was recreated and its non-Anglicised name became its formal name, Ceredigion.

The Ceredigion Senedd constituency was created with the same boundaries in 1999 (as an Assembly constituency).

Boundaries

The boundaries of this constituency mirror almost exactly those of the county of Ceredigion.

Proposed constituency changes
Under proposed constituency boundary changes announced in September 2016, ahead of the then next general election, the seat's boundaries were to be extended. The seat, which has the proposed name of Ceredigion and North Pembrokeshire, includes all of the current Ceredigion constituency, the northern part of the current Preseli Pembrokeshire constituency, a small part of Carmarthen West and South Pembrokeshire around the village of Dre-fach Felindre, as well the south-western part of Montgomeryshire around Llanidloes.

History
Ceredigion, formerly known by the anglicised version of its name as Cardiganshire, was first enfranchised in 1536 when King Henry VIII incorporated Wales within England. The county was given one member, who was to be elected by each person who owned property of a sufficient value. In addition the inhabitants of Cardigan, Aberystwyth, Adpar and Lampeter were given the right to elect one MP between them, with the vote restricted to the Freemen. The general election of 1715 saw the return of Lewis Pryse, who was expelled from the House of Commons in the following year for refusing to attend the House to take oaths of loyalty to King George I after the Jacobite rising, with which he sympathised.

Reformed elections
From 1832 the Reform Act changed the electoral system so that householders of homes worth over £10 were enfranchised in the boroughs. The Borough constituency was still dominated by the Loveden-Pryse family based in Gogerddan who were supporters of the Liberals; Pryse Pryse held the seat unopposed from 1818 until his death in 1849, except for the 1841 election when he narrowly retained the seat after a controversial contest. The Cardiganshire county constituency, however, was dominated by the Powell family of Nanteos who were Conservatives. William Edward Powell held the seat from 1816 until shortly before his death in 1854. By agreement between the followers of Gogerddan and Nanteos, neither challenged the others' nomination and as a result there were no contested elections in the county until 1859.

Following Powell's retirement, the representation fell to Ernest Vaughan of Trawscoed, whose politics were Conservative.

The county saw its first contest in the 1859 general election when Colonel W.T.R. Powell of Nanteos sought to re-establish the family's claim to the county seat. He was opposed by Arthur Saunders-Davies of Pentre but prevailed by a narrow margin. Both candidates held conservative views but Powell sat as a Liberal-Conservative.

However, the era where Nanteos could claim the seat were numbered, and Sir Thomas Lloyd of Bronwydd was mooted as a potential Liberal candidate at the 1854 by-election, and again at the General Elections of 1857 and 1859.

By the 1865 general election, Powell had indicated some twelve months prior to the election that he would retire and Lloyd of Bronwydd was selected as the Liberal candidate. However, when Powell reversed his decision, Lloyd issued an address stating that he would not oppose the sitting member. The result was that both Henry Richard and David Davies offered themselves as candidates. A selection meeting was arranged to be held at Aberaeron, but shortly before this took place, Powell announced his retirement. Lloyd now stated that he would now fight the seat after all and Richard withdrew in his favour. David Davies, however, did not withdraw and came within 361 votes of victory.

Lloyd transferred to the borough in the 1868 election when the seat was captured by Swansea industrialist, E.M. Richards. This election is often regarded as a landmark when tenant farmers allegedly refused to follow patterns of age-old deference and vote in line with the wishes of their landlords. Following this election there were claims of intimidation by Conservative landlords and a national fund was set up to support those purportedly evicted from their farms. In reality, however, Richards' victory owed much to the support of the powerful Pryse family of Gogerddan.

In 1874, the Conservative candidate Thomas Edward Lloyd of Coedmore captured the seat for the Conservatives, defeating Richards by 215 votes. The result was greeted with disbelief in Liberal ranks, particularly since the introduction of the secret ballot was expected to have favoured the Liberals. However, the Conservatives had chosen a candidate who was popular in his locality and not been involved in conflicts with his tenants. The Liberals were also caught unprepared for the contest, with Lloyd's candidature kept secret until nomination day. Much capital was also made of the fact that Lloyd was a Cardiganshire man, in contrast to Richards, a Swansea industrialist. The result was reversed in 1880 although there were close contests for the county thereafter, on a slightly widened franchise.

Single constituency
In a redistribution of seats for the 1885 general election, the borough constituency was abolished and absorbed into the county. This brought into the county seat the more radical politics of urban voters in the boroughs of Aberystwyth, Cardigan, Lampeter and Adpar. More significantly, the further widening of the franchise in 1884 added between five and six thousand new voters to the register by extending the pattern of household suffrage to the counties. The majority of these voters would have been tenant farmers, the more prosperous agricultural labourers, and householders in small towns or large villages such as Tregaron, Aberaeron, New Quay, Aberporth, Tal-y-bont and Borth, which had not been part of the old Cardigan Boroughs constituency. The impact of the widening of the franchise and boundary changes was to increase the electorate from 5,026 in 1883 to 12,308 by 1886. It was assumed that these changes would make the county a reasonably safe bet for the Liberal Party and that supporters of Gladstone would be comfortably returned at every election. These structural changes to the political arrangements of the county were also taking place against wider social and economic developments which affected all aspects of Cardiganshire life. Traditional industries were in decline, agriculture was increasingly in crisis and it was becoming increasingly difficult for a still-increasing population to earn a living within their native parishes and communities. As a result, there were two major consequences. Firstly there was a significant population shift as a result of emigration, in the majority of cases to the south Wales valleys. Secondly, the great landed estates of the county, which had for so long dominated the politics of the county, were in many cases heavily in debt. This second factor contributed to the loss of landowner influence in the politics of the county, a trend that became very apparent at the first elections to the Cardiganshire County Council.

Initially, the predictions that Gladstonian Liberals would dominate county politics were realised, in 1885, David Davies was elected to represent the constituency with a majority of 2,323 (24.2%) on a turnout of 78%, heavily defeating the Conservative, Matthew Vaughan Davies. Although David Davies was no public speaker, he drew substantial support in Cardiganshire as a generous benefactor of the new university college at Aberystwyth and also through his links with Calvinistic Methodism, which had over 13,000 members in the county. Allied to this was a particularly effective Liberal association which paid close attention to the registration of voters.

In 1886, however, Davies broke with Gladstone over home rule for Ireland in 1886 and a number of his associates such as Robert J. Davies, Cwrtmawr followed him into the Liberal Unionist camp. He sought re-election as a Liberal Unionist but lost by 9 votes to William Bowen Rowlands, who was the Gladstonian candidate. This election split the Liberal Party in Cardiganshire and the election was hotly contested with almost all the landowners, including those previously regarded as having Liberal sympathies, supporting Davies. He also received the support of several prominent Liberals, especially from his own Methodist denomination. The result of the election was largely attributed to the influence of nonconformist ministers over their congregations, although the more effective canvassing of supporters by the Liberal Association was also identified as an important factor.

Even though Bowen Rowlands's victory was by the closest of margins it was a decisive moment in the political history of Cardiganshire. It proved that a Gladstonian Liberal candidate, even an Anglican with strong Irish Nationalist sympathies, could triumph in Cardiganshire even against the resources and religious connections of a candidate such as David Davies. Although Liberal Unionism continued to be championed by a relatively small group, led by the journalist Henry Tobit Evans, who published a newspaper, Y Brython, at Lampeter, most of the leading Liberals who had defected to Davies eventually returned to the fold, in some cases to contest the 1889 County Council elections. The demise of Liberal Unionism was confirmed at the 1892 general election when, William Jones, a self-made Birmingham draper who had a small estate in Cardiganshire and was a member of the Cardiganshire County Council ran with the support of Joseph Chamberlain. Chamberlain had sponsored a number of Nonconformist unionist candidates in Wales in the hope of capitalising upon perceived antipathy towards Irish Nationalism. Despite spending heavily and producing a farmer evicted at the 1868 Election on his platform, Jones was heavily defeated by Bowen Rowlands. Rowlands served until 1895.

Once Rowlands's intention not to stand again was known, Matthew Vaughan Davies of Tan-y-Bwlch, who had been the Conservative candidate in the seat in 1885, but who had subsequently joined the Liberal Party, emerged as a contender for the nomination and was eventually chosen by a delegate conference, defeating Wynford Phillips by 160 votes to 111. The choice of Vaughan Davies was controversial and was strongly opposed by the Aberystwyth-based Cambrian News on the basis of his former association with the Conservative Party. Indeed, the paper went as far as to equate the division with that of 1886. There is no doubt that the choice of Vaughan Davies created deep divisions in the Liberal ranks. However, despite these divisions he saw off a strong Conservative candidate by a comfortable if reduced majority.

Matthew Vaughan-Davies was the longest serving MP for the constituency, holding it from 1895 to 1921. His closest electoral call came in the 'Khaki election' of 1900 when he had a majority of 781 (9.4%) over J.C. Harford of Falcondale. Thereafter, Vaughan Davies was comfortably returned at each election but the vitality of the Liberal Association was in serious decline. During this time the Cambrian News had tempered its opposition to him and grudgingly admitted that Vaughan-Davies had won friends and supporters by his adherence to Liberal policies.

By 1914 the Liberal Association was heavily dependent on Vaughan Davies's role as treasurer to keep it going. In the meantime, Vaughan Davies remained on poor terms with prominent Liberals, including John Gibson, editor of the Cambrian News until his death in 1915.

Like most Welsh Liberals, he supported David Lloyd George in the split in the Liberal Party, and not H. H. Asquith, and was therefore returned unopposed as a Coalition Liberal in 1918.

Liberal infighting (1921–1950)
In many ways the Liberals had become the new elite in Cardiganshire by the time of the First World War. This was demonstrated in 1919 when John Humphreys Davies, the nonconformist squire of Cwrtmawr, was appointed Principal of the University College, Aberystwyth, at the expense of Thomas Jones, who was championed by Lord Davies of Llandinam, grandson of David Davies.

With Vaughan Davies known to be a supporter of Lloyd George, it was natural that Lloyd George looked to him to boost his support in the House of Lords and awarded him a peerage in the New Years' Honours list in 1921. Although he would have preferred to be called 'Lord Ceredigion', the Garter King of Arms refused this as an inappropriate title for a Baron, and so Vaughan Davies took his title from the River Ystwyth which ran past his home. The peerage created a vacancy in a historically Liberal seat and the Asquithites decided to take the Lloyd Georgeites on in their 'backyard' in what became a memorable by-election.

Ernest Evans, who asserted on his election posters that he was 'THE Liberal candidate', was a Barrister from Aberystwyth and had been Private Secretary to Lloyd George himself, and therefore had the blessing of the Coalition and official support from the Conservatives. A number of possible Asquithian Liberal candidates were approached to contest the seat against Evans and eventually the choice fell upon W. Llewelyn Williams who was sponsored by the Asquithite 'Welsh Liberal Federation'. No other candidate stood and in the straight fight, Evans won with a majority of 3,590 (14.6%).

Evans held on as a 'National Liberal' (as Lloyd George's supporters called themselves) in the 1922 general election but with a slim majority of 515 votes (2.0%) over Rhys Hopkin Morris.

The sudden shotgun merger of the two factions in the Liberal Party led to Evans getting the official approval of the unified party for the 1923 election. However, the Conservatives decided to fight and this deprived him of their votes. Hopkin Morris decided to fight again as an unofficial Liberal and won with a 5,078 vote majority. Hopkin Morris was lucky to survive the 1924 election, a disaster for the Liberals, by being returned unopposed.

The first Labour Party candidate stood against Rhys Hopkin Morris at the 1931 general election and polled 24% of the vote in a straight fight against Morris, who had a 13,752 (52.0%) majority.

In 1932, Morris left Parliament temporarily (he was later to return as MP for Carmarthen) when he was appointed as a Metropolitan Police magistrate. The byelection on 22 September 1932 saw the first three-way fight between the parties, but was won by Owen Evans for the Liberals. Like many of the Liberal MPs he had been a barrister. Evans died shortly before the 1945 general election, but the seat was easily held by his successor Roderic Bowen. Unusually the Labour vote actually fell in percentage terms compared with the previous election despite the Labour landslide in the country at large.

Labour challenge (1950–1972)
Labour established itself as the main challenger to the Liberals at the 1950 general election in a three-way contest, and the Conservatives opted out of the contest thereafter until 1964. This was partly a move to keep the seat from going Labour. Plaid Cymru first fought the seat in 1959 and kept their deposit (just, with 12.8% of the vote).

With a four-way contest involving the Conservatives and Plaid Cymru at the 1964 general election, and a national swing to Labour, Roderic Bowen suffered a precipitate decline in his share of the vote to only 38.4%; he was re-elected with a majority of 2,219 (7.4%) over Labour. After the death of the Speaker in 1965, Bowen accepted the offer to become a Deputy Speaker, which prevented him from speaking on behalf of his constituency. For the 1966 election, Labour selected Elystan Morgan who had been a member of Plaid Cymru until 1964; with a further national swing and Morgan making a credible bid for the Welsh-speaking vote, Labour won the seat by 523 votes.

1974 onwards
In boundary changes in 1983, the constituency was merged with a northern area of Pembrokeshire and also took a Welsh version of its name, becoming known as Ceredigion and Pembroke North.

Ceredigion was recreated for the 1997 election as it reverted to its former borders, having lost the part of North Pembrokeshire in boundary changes.

Mark Williams, first elected in 2005, was the first non-Welsh speaking Member of Parliament elected to represent the constituency since Bowen Rowlands (MP from 1886 until 1892, who declared at a meeting in Aberystwyth when adopted as candidate that he could not speak Welsh). At the 2010 general election, he received a massive increase in his vote, polling over 50% of the votes cast and raising his majority from 219 to 8,324 over the Plaid Cymru candidate, Penri James.

In 2015, Williams suffered a decline of over 14% in his vote share, in common with other Liberal Democrat incumbents across the UK. However, after a campaign which made national headlines due to prior controversial comments by both the Plaid Cymru and Labour candidates, Plaid Cymru were unable to capitalise as their vote share went down slightly. The Conservative vote also declined, while UKIP, Labour and the Greens all improved on their 2010 performance. Williams retained the seat to become the only Liberal Democrat MP in Wales, and one of only eight across the UK.

In 2017, Williams lost his seat to Ben Lake by 104 votes (0.2%). Labour moved from fifth to third in the seat and were roughly 3,000 votes behind Williams and Lake, their best result in Ceredigion since 1997, and the Tories fell to fourth but increased their vote by more than 3,000. The 29.2% won by Plaid Cymru in 2017 was the lowest winning vote share of the election and the only seat won with less than 30% of the vote. At the 2019 General Election Lake substantially increased both his majority and vote share, with the Liberal Democrats falling to third place.

Members of Parliament

MPs 1541–1640

MPs after 1640

Short Parliament
1640: James Lewis

Long Parliament
 1640–1644: Walter Lloyd (Royalist) – disabled to sit, 5 February 1644
 1646–1648: Sir Richard Pryse, 1st Baronet – excluded in Pride's Purge, December 1648

Cardiganshire was unrepresented in the Barebones Parliament

First Protectorate Parliament
1654–1655: Col. James Philipps
1654–1655: Rev. Jenkin Lloyd

Second Protectorate Parliament
1656: Col. James Philipps
1656–1658: Col. John Clark
1656–1658: James Lewis

Third Protectorate Parliament
 1659: Col. James Philipps

Elections

Elections in the 19th century

Elections in the 1830s

Elections in the 1840s

Elections in the 1850s

Elections in the 1860s

Elections in the 1870s

Elections in the 1880s

Elections in the 1890s

Rowlands is appointed Recorder of Swansea, requiring a by-election.

Elections in the 20th century

Elections in the 1900s

Elections in the 1910s

Elections in the 1920s

Elections in the 1930s

Elections in the 1940s

Elections in the 1950s

Elections in the 1960s

Elections in the 1970s

For 1983, 1987 and 1992; see Ceredigion and Pembroke North

Elections in the 1990s

Elections in the 21st century

Elections in the 2000s

Elections in the 2010s

Of the 52 rejected ballots:
41 were either unmarked or it was uncertain who the vote was for.
11 voted for more than one candidate.

Of the 117 rejected ballots:
87 were either unmarked or it was uncertain who the vote was for.
30 voted for more than one candidate.

See also 
 Ceredigion (Senedd constituency)
 1854 Cardiganshire by-election
 1921 Cardiganshire by-election
 1932 Cardiganshire by-election
 2000 Ceredigion by-election
 List of parliamentary constituencies in Dyfed
 List of parliamentary constituencies in Wales

Notes

References

Sources

External links
nomis Constituency Profile for Ceredigion – presenting data from the ONS annual population survey and other official statistics.
Politics Resources (Election results from 1922 onwards)
Electoral Calculus (Election results from 1955 onwards)
2017 Election House Of Commons Library 2017 Election report
A Vision Of Britain Through Time (Constituency elector numbers)

Parliamentary constituencies in Mid Wales
Constituencies of the Parliament of the United Kingdom established in 1536
Politics of Ceredigion
Elections in Ceredigion